Salah Mohamed Samadi (born September 16, 1978 in Hussein Dey) is a former Algerian international football player. He spent the majority of his career with USM Blida and has two caps for the Algeria national team.

National team statistics

References

External links

1976 births
2002 African Cup of Nations players
Algeria international footballers
Algerian footballers
People from Hussein Dey (commune)
USM Blida players
WR Bentalha players
Living people
JS Bordj Ménaïel players
Association football goalkeepers
21st-century Algerian people